Borek  is a village in the administrative district of Gmina Deszczno, within Gorzów County, Lubusz Voivodeship, in western Poland.

History
The area became part of the emerging Polish state in the 10th century. Following Poland's fragmentation, it formed part of the Duchy of Greater Poland. Later on, the area passed to Brandenburg, Bohemia (Czechia), Prussia, and Germany. Following Germany's defeat in World War II in 1945, the area became again part of Poland.

References

Villages in Gorzów County